10 from 5 is a compilation album by alternative rock group Dramarama, released in 1993.

Track listing
 "Work for Food"
 "What Are We Gonna Do?"
 "Last Cigarette"
 "Haven't Got a Clue"
 "Shadowless Heart"
 "Some Crazy Dame"
 "Would You Like"
 "Memo from Turner"
 "It's Still Warm"
 "Work for Food" [Acoustic Version]

References

Dramarama compilation albums
1993 compilation albums
Chameleon (label) compilation albums